Gomphurus vastus, the cobra clubtail, is a species of clubtail in the dragonfly family Gomphidae, found in the eastern United States.

The IUCN Red List conservation status of Gomphurus vastus is "Least Concern", with no immediate threat to the species' survival.

References

Gomphidae
Insects described in 1862